THJ-2201  is an indazole-based synthetic cannabinoid that presumably acts as a potent agonist of the CB1 receptor and has been sold online as a designer drug.

It is a structural analog of AM-2201 in which the central indole ring has been replaced by indazole.

Pharmacology
THJ-2201 acts as a full agonist with a binding affinity of 1.34nM at CB1 and 1.32nM at CB2 cannabinoid receptors.

Side effects

THJ-2201 has been linked to at least one hospitalization and death due to its use.

Legal status

Because of the hazards associated with recreational use of this compound, it is classified as a Schedule I controlled substance in the United States.

It is also an Anlage II controlled drug in Germany.

See also 
 AM-694
 AM-1235
 AM-2232
 AM-2233
 FUBIMINA
 JWH-018
 List of AM cannabinoids
 List of JWH cannabinoids
 NM-2201
 THJ-018

References 

Cannabinoids
Designer drugs
Organofluorides
Naphthoylindazoles